Ko Ko Naing (born on 20 July 1964) is a Burmese politician who currently serves as an Amyotha Hluttaw member of parliament for Sagaing Region No. 8 constituency. He is a member of the National League for Democracy.

Early life and education 
Ko Ko Naing was born on July 20, 1964; in Kalewa, Sagaing Region, Myanmar . He graduated with B.Sc (Botany) from Mandalay University. In 2001, he had worked as video industry and the literature work. He had served campaigner in the 1990 election and in 2012 election campaign.

Political career
He is a member of the National League for Democracy Party, he was elected as an Amyotha Hluttaw representative from Sagaing Region No. 8 parliamentary constituency.

References

1964 births
Living people
People from Sagaing Region
Members of the House of Nationalities
National League for Democracy politicians
Mandalay University alumni